Roberto Chavez (born Roberto Esteban Chavez; August 3, 1932) is an American artist. known for his personally symbolic portraits, public murals and "funny-grotesque" paintings  that reflect the multicultural landscape of Los Angeles. He was recently included in the Getty Center's Pacific Standard Time: Art in L.A., 1945-1980 and the Smithsonian’s Our America: The Latino Presence in American Art exhibits.

Background
Chavez was born in Los Angeles, California to Mexican immigrants who left the chaos and dangers of post-Revolution Mexico. Chavez and his seven siblings were raised  in the Maravilla neighborhood in East Los Angeles, which at the time was inhabited by a mixture of working class families, mostly Latino, but also Jewish, Mexican, Armenian, Italian, Russian and Japanese emigres.

Education
Chavez earned his Master of Fine Arts in 1961 at the University of California at Los Angeles, where he met and worked alongside Charles Garabedian, Gordon Rice, Eduardo Carrillo and Maxwell Hendler. In the early 1960s, Chavez became part of the "emerging gallery scene along La Cienega Boulevard" at the Ceeje Gallery, which in contrast to the Ferus and Landau Galleries that often exhibited New York artists, highlighted local, ethnic and women artists.

Murals 

In the mid-1970s, Chavez began painting public murals throughout the city of Los Angeles, especially East L.A. where the La Raza political movement was gaining ground. His 1972 anti-war mural Porque Se Pelean? Que No Son Carnales became part of artist Sandra de la Loza's Mural Remix. show at LACMAMural Remixed.

In 1974, Chavez painted The Path to Knowledge and the False University, a 200-foot mural on the East Los Angeles Community College campus, where he worked as an arts educator and chair of the Chicano Studies department. Although the mural was destroyed by the college, the mural, its impact and the political questions surrounding the destruction were detailed in two museum exhibits: "Roberto Chavez and The False University: A Retrospective" at the Vincent Price Museum and "Murales Rebeldes: L.A. Chicana/o Murals under Siege" Pacific Standard Time: LA/LA Beyond Borders in 2017.

Recent exhibitions
 Zapata Después de Zapata Museo del Palacio de Bellas Artes, Mexico City, Mexico November 2019 - February 2020. 
 Pacific Standard Time: LA/LA
MURALES REBELDES!: Contested Chicana/o Public Art, LA Plaza de Cultura y Artes, Los Angeles, September 2017 - March 2018; San Francisco, California Historical Society, April - September 2018; Sacramento, California Museum, July - December 2019.
A Universal History of Infamy, August 2017 - February 2018, LACMA (Los Angeles County Museum of Art
 Our American: The Latino Presence in American Art, Smithsonian American Art Museum, Washington DC, October 2013 - March 2014, National Tour through 2017
 Pacific Standard Time: Art in L.A. 1945 - 1980 exhibits:
Art Along the Hyphen: The Mexican-American Generation  Autry National Center, Los Angeles October 2011 - January 2012
L.A. Raw: Abject Expressionism in Los Angeles, 1945-1980, From Rico Lebrun to Paul McCarthy, Pasadena Museum of California Art 2012  January - May 2012
 Roberto Chavez and The False University: A Retrospective, Vincent Price Art Museum, September - December 2014

References

Further reading

External links
 El Tamalito del Hoyo, by Roberto Chavez, 1959, oil on masonite at the Smithsonian American Art Museum.
 "Self-Portrait with Speedy Gonzales", by Roberto Chavez, 1963, oil on canvas.
 "Ladies Art Class, Sawtelle", by Roberto Chavez, 1967, oil on canvas.
 "Jueves", by Roberto Chavez, 1992, Print Poster. Center for the Study of Political Graphics. 

UCLA School of the Arts and Architecture alumni
Painters from California
American artists of Mexican descent
1932 births
Living people